Dioxanone may refer to:

Trimethylene carbonate (1,3-dioxan-2-one)
p-Dioxanone (1,4-dioxan-2-one)